The 1982 NCAA Women's Division I Swimming and Diving Championships were the first annual NCAA-sanctioned swim meet to determine the team and individual national champions of Division I women's collegiate swimming and diving in the United States. The inaugural event was hosted at the O'Connell Center at the University of Florida in Gainesville, Florida. The men's and women's titles would not be held at the same site until 2006.

Hosts Florida topped the team standings and took home the inaugural NCAA women's team title.

Team standings
Note: Top 10 only
(H) = Hosts
Full results

Individual events

Swimming events

|-
|50 yard freestyle

|-
|100 yard freestyle

|-
|200 yard freestyle

|-
|500 yard freestyle

|-
|1,650 yard freestyle

|-
|50 yard backstroke

|-
|100 yard backstroke

|-
|200 yard backstroke

|-
|50 yard breaststroke

|-
|100 yard breaststroke

|-
|200 yard breaststroke

|-
|50 yard butterfly

|-
|100 yard butterfly

|-
|200 yard butterfly

|-
|100 yard IM

|-
|200 yard IM

|-
|400 yard IM

|}

Diving events

|-
|One-meter diving

|-
|Three-meter diving

|}

See also
List of college swimming and diving teams

References

NCAA Division I Swimming And Diving Championships
NCAA Division I Swimming And Diving Championships
NCAA Division I Women's Swimming and Diving Championships